The World is a biweekly newspaper in Coos Bay, Oregon, United States. From its office on Anderson Avenue in downtown Coos Bay, The World serves Oregon's South Coast, including the cities of Coos Bay, North Bend, Reedsport, Bandon, Lakeside, Coquille and Myrtle Point.

History
The World was first published in 1878 as The Coast Mail. During the first half of the 20th century, many name changes and mergers took place. Eventually, owner/publisher Sheldon F. Sackett changed the newspaper's name to The World in the 1960s. Sackett owned several media outlets including KISN, a radio station in Portland. His heirs sold The World to Scripps League Newspapers in 1973. Scripps League Newspapers was acquired by Pulitzer Newspapers Inc. in 1996; Lee Enterprises acquired Pulitzer in 2005.

Southwestern Oregon Publishing Company purchased the Bandon Western World in 2003 and the Reedsport Umpqua Post in 2004. Both weeklies are printed at The World in Coos Bay.

In 2015, The World launched a new weekly newspaper, the Coquille Valley Courant, which serves the Coquille Valley area, including Coquille, Myrtle Point, Powers and surrounding towns. The Courant ended publication on December 29, 2015.

In January 2020, the paper was sold by Lee to Country Media, Inc. On July 30, 2020, The World announced it would reduce the number of print editions from five days a week to two days. In August 2020, the Bandon Western World ended publication. The World was moved from Commercial to Anderson in October 2021.

Awards
The World won 15 awards in the 2014 Oregon Newspaper Publishers Association 2014 Better Newspaper Contest, including first place statewide for Best Online Coverage of Breaking News, beating both The Oregonian and the (Medford) Mail Tribune.

Other awards in The World's circulation category included second place for best editorial, first place for best educational coverage, first place for enterprise reporting, first place for best lifestyle coverage, third place for best sports story, second place for best writing, second place for Page One design, first and second place for best photo essay, second place for best sports photo, first place for best multimedia element, first place for best overall website and second place for best web design.

References

External links

The World

Coos Bay, Oregon
1878 establishments in Oregon
Newspapers published in Oregon
Oregon Coast
Oregon Newspaper Publishers Association
Publications established in 1878
Biweekly newspapers published in the United States